Magnant is an RTS (real-time strategy) game by American studio Mohydine Entertainment which features the military expansion of a colony of ants.

Card system
There is a card system which permits the player to draw cards during the game which can bring diverse bonuses to the colony; to obtain these cards, the player can exchange points gained during matches for 3 copies of one type of card.  The player can also trade these cards with other Magnant players at the Magnant official website and also steal or gain 1 copy of a card in the defeated opponent's deck, as well as lose 1 copy of  1 of his or hers cards when having been defeated.

Corresponding category
Magnant enters properly in the RTS category and is somehow considered as a simulation game which simulates the activity of ants, it is not considered completely a simulation game because it concentrates on too many unrealistic features, such as ants carrying modern weapons (Guns, rifles, grenades) and ants employing siege machinery such as catapults, ballistics, etc.

Trial version
A free trial version of the game has also been released; it features single-player matches, campaigns and runs for up to an hour.

External links
Official Magnant website
Yahoo review
Magnant demo

2006 video games
Multiplayer and single-player video games
Real-time strategy video games
Video games about ants
Video games about insects
Video games developed in the United States
Windows games
Windows-only games